The 2003 Chicago Cubs season was the 132nd season of the Chicago Cubs franchise, the 128th in the National League and the 88th at Wrigley Field. The Cubs were managed by Dusty Baker in his first year in Chicago. The Cubs went 88–74 during the 2003 season and won the National League Central Division for the first time since the division's formation in 1994, and the team's first division title since its 1989 NL East title. In the National League Division Series, the Cubs defeated the Atlanta Braves three games to two for their first postseason series win since 1908. The Cubs lost to the Florida Marlins four games to three in the National League Championship Series.

Previous season 
The Cubs were coming off of a poor year in 2002, finishing 67–95 in fifth place in the NL Central and costing manager Don Baylor his job. The Cubs hired Dusty Baker, fresh off his World Series appearance with the San Francisco Giants, to replace Baylor.

Offseason
 December 4, 2002: Todd Hundley and Chad Hermansen were traded by the Cubs to the Los Angeles Dodgers for Mark Grudzielanek and Eric Karros.
January 13, 2003: Midre Cummings was signed as a free agent with the Cubs.
January 13, 2003: Aaron Small was signed as a free agent with the Cubs.
March 4, 2003: Trenidad Hubbard was signed as a free agent with the Cubs.
March 29, 2003: Aaron Small was released by the Cubs.

Regular season

Summary 
The team's success can be attributed first and foremost to its starting rotation, which featured Mark Prior, Kerry Wood, Carlos Zambrano, and Matt Clement, each of whom won at least 13 games. The pitching staff as a whole led the National League in strikeouts with 1,404, over 100 more than any other team. While not nearly as dominant in hitting, the Cubs' lineup was bolstered by acquisitions at what was a very active trade deadline, including Aramis Ramírez, Randall Simon, and Kenny Lofton.

The team started slow but finished September with a 19–8 record to win the NL Central. As the division winner with the third best record, the Cubs faced the Atlanta Braves who had finished the season in a tie for the best record in the majors in a best of five games format. The Cubs won the first game of the series and the teams alternated wins leading to a game 5 at Turner Field to determine the series winner. The Cubs won the game 5–1.

The series win, their first since 1908, resulted in a matchup against the Florida Marlins for the right to go to the World Series. The Marlins won the first game in Chicago, but the Cubs won the next three to take a three games to one lead. Florida won game five as the series shifted back to Chicago for games six and seven. With Mark Prior on the mound, the Cubs took a 3–1 lead into the 8th inning before a series of errors led to an 8-run inning for the Marlins. The win forced a game seven with Kerry Wood on the mound for the Cubs. In a high-scoring affair that included a Kerry Wood home run, the Marlins shocked the Cubs 9–6 to deny the Cubs a trip to their first World Series since 1945.

The 2003 season brought a great deal of national attention to the Cubs, both positive and negative. On one hand, their surprising regular season run to first place in the NL Central, and the excellent performances of their top three pitchers, all of whom were age 26 or younger, seemed to suggest that the Cubs would be contenders for the foreseeable future. At the same time, however, the Cubs' squandering of the 3-1 series lead in the NLCS, and the manner in which it occurred, seemed to reaffirm the perceptions of the Cubs as "lovable losers" and a cursed franchise.

Season standings

National League Central

Record vs. opponents

Transactions
April 21, 2003: Trenidad Hubbard was purchased by the Cubs from Oaxaca (Mexican League).
May 9, 2003: Alan Benes was sent to the Texas Rangers by the Cubs as part of a conditional deal.
June 3, 2003: Sam Fuld was drafted by the Cubs in the 24th round of the 2003 amateur draft, but did not sign.
June 3, 2003: Tim Lincecum was drafted by the Cubs in the 48th round of the 2003 amateur draft, but did not sign.
June 20, 2003: Mark Bellhorn was traded by the Cubs to the Colorado Rockies for José Hernández.
 July 23, 2003: Kenny Lofton and Aramis Ramírez were traded by the Pittsburgh Pirates with cash to the Cubs for a player to be named later, José Hernández, and Matt Bruback. The Cubs sent Bobby Hill (August 15, 2003) to the Pirates to complete the trade.
August 17, 2003: Randall Simon was traded by the Pirates to the Cubs for Ray Sadler.

Roster

Game log

|- align="center" bgcolor="bbffbb"
| 1 || March 31 || @ Mets || 15–2 || Wood (1–0) || Glavine (0–1) || || 53,586 || 1–0 || 
|-

|- align="center" bgcolor="ffbbbb" 
| 2 || April 2 || @ Mets || 4–1 || Leiter (1–0) || Clement (0–1) || Benítez (1) || 20,594 || 1–1 || 
|- align="center" bgcolor="bbffbb"
| 3 || April 3 || @ Mets || 6–3 || Prior (1–0) || Trachsel (0–1) || || 17,244 || 2–1 || 
|- align="center" bgcolor="ffbbbb"
| 4 || April 4 || @ Reds || 10–9 || Williamson (1–0) || Veres (0–1) || || 29,048 || 2–2 || 
|- align="center" bgcolor="bbffbb"
| 5 || April 5 || @ Reds || 9–7 || Zambrano (1–0) || Haynes (0–2) || Borowski (1) || 28,908 || 3–2 || 
|- align="center" bgcolor="ffbbbb"
| 6 || April 6 || @ Reds || 5–4 || White (1–0) || Guthrie (0–1) || Williamson (1) || 24,023 || 3–3 || 
|- align="center" bgcolor="bbbbbb"
| – || April 7 || Expos || colspan=7|Postponed (snow) Rescheduled for April 8
|- align="center" bgcolor="bbffbb"
| 7 || April 8 || Expos || 6–1 || Clement (1–1) || Day (1–1) || || 29,138 || 4–3 || 
|- align="center" bgcolor="bbffbb"
| 8 || April 9 || Expos || 3–0 || Prior (2–0) || Vázquez (1–1) || || 29,966 || 5–3 || 
|- align="center" bgcolor="ffbbbb"
| 9 || April 10 || Expos || 7–1 || Armas (2–1) || Estes (0–1) || || 30,225 || 5–4 || 
|- align="center" bgcolor="ffbbbb"
| 10 || April 11 || Pirates || 3–2 || D'Amico (1–1) || Zambrano (1–1) || Williams (5) || 33,605 || 5–5 || 
|- align="center" bgcolor="bbffbb"
| 11 || April 12 || Pirates || 4–0 || Wood (2–0) || Benson (2–1) || Borowski (2) || 35,226 || 6–5 || 
|- align="center" bgcolor="bbffbb"
| 12 || April 13 || Pirates || 4–3 || Farnsworth (1–0) || Boehringer (0–1) || Borowski (3) || 29,558 || 7–5 || 
|- align="center" bgcolor="ffbbbb"
| 13 || April 14 || Reds || 11–3 || Anderson (1–1) || Prior (2–1) || Riedling (1) || 37,528 || 7–6 || 
|- align="center" bgcolor="bbffbb"
| 14 || April 15 || Reds || 11–1 || Estes (1–1) || Graves (0–2) || || 31,642 || 8–6 || 
|- align="center" bgcolor="bbffbb"
| 15 || April 16 || Reds || 10–4 || Zambrano (2–1) || Wilson (0–1) || || 27,388 || 9–6 || 
|- align="center" bgcolor="bbffbb"
| 16 || April 17 || Reds || 16–3 || Wood (3–0) || Haynes (0–4) || Benes (1) || 29,672 || 10–6 || 
|- align="center" bgcolor="bbffbb"
| 17 || April 18 || @ Pirates || 7–2 || Clement (2–1) || Benson (2–2) || || 15,037 || 11–6 || 
|- align="center" bgcolor="bbffbb"
| 18 || April 19 || @ Pirates || 6 – 1 (10) || Prior (3–1) || Sauerbeck (0–1) || || 31,518 || 12–6 || 
|- align="center" bgcolor="ffbbbb"
| 19 || April 20 || @ Pirates || 8–2 || Torres (2–0) || Estes (1–2) || || 14,854 || 12–7 || 
|- align="center" bgcolor="bbffbb"
| 20 || April 22 || Padres || 7–2 || Zambrano (3–1) || Lawrence (2–2) || || 35,185 || 13–7 || 
|- align="center" bgcolor="ffbbbb"
| 21 || April 23 || Padres || 2–0 || Eaton (1–1) || Wood (3–1) || Herges (1) || 35,768 || 13–8 || 
|- align="center" bgcolor="ffbbbb"
| 22 || April 24 || Padres || 2–1 || Pérez (1–2) || Clement (2–2) || Wright (2) || 35,673 || 13–9 || 
|- align="center" bgcolor="bbffbb"
| 23 || April 25 || @ Rockies || 11–7 || Prior (4–1) || Cruz (3–1) || || 32,162 || 14–9 || 
|- align="center" bgcolor="ffbbbb"
| 24 || April 26 || @ Rockies || 8–5 || Chacón (4–0) || Estes (1–3) || Jiménez (5) || 35,604 || 14–10 || 
|- align="center" bgcolor="ffbbbb"
| 25 || April 27 || @ Rockies || 6–3 || Oliver (1–2) || Zambrano (3–2) || Jiménez (6) || 35,070 || 14–11 || 
|- align="center" bgcolor="bbffbb"
| 26 || April 29 || @ Giants || 4–2 || Wood (4–1) || Rueter (2–1) || Borowski (4) || 39,839 || 15–11 || 
|- align="center" bgcolor="ffbbbb"
| 27 || April 30 || @ Giants || 5–0 || Schmidt (3–0) || Clement (2–3) || || 40,124 || 15–12 || 
|-

|- align="center" bgcolor="bbffbb"
| 28 || May 1 || @ Giants || 5 – 1 (10) || Cruz (1–0) || Worrell (1–1) || || 41,524 || 16–12 || 
|- align="center" bgcolor="bbffbb" 
| 29 || May 2 || Rockies || 7–4 || Estes (2–3) || Chacón (4–1) || Borowski (5) || 29,236 || 17–12 || 
|- align="center" bgcolor="ffbbbb"
| 30 || May 3 || Rockies || 6–4 || Speier (2–0) || Guthrie (0–2) || Jiménez (7) || 38,332 || 17–13 || 
|- align="center" bgcolor="bbffbb" 
| 31 || May 4 || Rockies || 5 – 4 (10)|| Borowski (1–0) || Reed (2–1) || || 37,223 || 18–13 || 
|- align="center" bgcolor="ffbbbb"
| 32 || May 5 || Brewers || 5–3 || Sheets (3–3) || Clement (2–4) || DeJean (6) || 35,304 || 18–14 || 
|- align="center" bgcolor="ffbbbb"
| 33 || May 6 || Brewers || 9–6 || Leskanic (2–0)  || Cruz (1–1) || DeJean (7) || 34,240 || 18–15 || 
|- align="center" bgcolor="bbffbb" 
| 34 || May 7 || Brewers || 2–1 || Estes (3–3) || Rusch (1–6) || Borowski (6) || 37,574 || 19–15 || 
|- align="center" bgcolor="ffbbbb"
| 35 || May 9 || Cardinals || 6–3 || Morris (4–2) || Zambrano (3–3) || Fassero (1) || 38,531 || 19–16 || 
|- align="center" bgcolor="bbffbb" 
| 36 || May 10 || Cardinals || 3 – 2 (10) || Remlinger (1–0) || Eldred (2–1) || || 38,106 || 20–16 || 
|- align="center" bgcolor="bbbbbb"
| – || May 11 || Cardinals || colspan=7|Postponed (rain) Rescheduled for September 2
|- align="center" bgcolor="bbffbb" 
| 37 || May 12 || @ Brewers || 11–5 || Prior (5–1) || Rusch (1–7) || || 19,106 || 21–16 || 
|- align="center" bgcolor="bbffbb"  
| 38 || May 13 || @ Brewers || 7–2 || Estes (4–3) || Quevedo (0–1) || || 18,454 || 22–16 || 
|- align="center" bgcolor="bbffbb" 
| 39 || May 14 || @ Brewers || 6–1 || Zambrano (4–3) || Kinney (2–3) || || 27,566 || 23–16 || 
|- align="center" bgcolor="bbffbb" 
| 40 || May 15 || @ Brewers || 4 – 2 (17) || Farnsworth (2–0) || Kieschnick (0–1) || Wellemeyer (1) || 31,624 || 24–16 || 
|- align="center" bgcolor="ffbbbb"
| 41 || May 16 || @ Cardinals || 7–4 || Williams (5–0) || Clement (2–5) || Eldred (2) || 42,589 || 24–17 || 
|- align="center" bgcolor="bbffbb" 
| 42 || May 17 || @ Cardinals || 2–1 || Remlinger (2–0) || Kline (1–4) || Borowski (7) || 45,385 || 25–17 || 
|- align="center" bgcolor="ffbbbb"
| 43 || May 18 || @ Cardinals || 6–3 || Hermanson (1–1) || Cruz (1–2) || Eldred (3) || 45,773 || 25–18 || 
|- align="center" bgcolor="ffbbbb"
| 44 || May 19 || @ Cardinals || 2–0 || Morris (5–3) || Zambrano (4–4) || || 46,734 || 25–19 || 
|- align="center" bgcolor="bbbbbb"
| – || May 20 || @ Pirates || colspan=7|Postponed (rain) Rescheduled for September 19
|- align="center" bgcolor="ffbbbb"
| 45 || May 21 || @ Pirates || 5–2 || D'Amico (4–4) || Wood (4–2) || Williams (13) || 35,086 || 25–20 || 
|- align="center" bgcolor="bbffbb" 
| 46 || May 22 || @ Pirates || 3–2 || Remlinger (3–0) || Sauerbeck (0–4) || Borowski (8) || 14,544 || 26–20 || 
|- align="center" bgcolor="ffbbbb"
| 47 || May 23 || @ Astros || 7–5 || Linebrink (1–1) || Prior (5–2) || Wagner (13) || 29,660 || 26–21 || 
|- align="center" bgcolor="bbffbb" 
| 48 || May 24 || @ Astros || 3–2 || Estes (5–3) || Redding (3–4) || Borowski (9) || 37,839 || 27–21 || 
|- align="center" bgcolor="bbffbb" 
| 49 || May 25 || @ Astros || 7–3 || Zambrano (5–4) || Miller (2–6) || || 37,565 || 28–21 || 
|- align="center" bgcolor="ffbbbb"
| 50 || May 26 || Pirates || 10–0 || Fogg (2–2) || Wood (4–3) || || 40,225 || 28–22 || 
|- align="center" bgcolor="ffbbbb"
| 51 || May 27 || Pirates || 9–4 || Benson (5–5) || Clement (2–6) || || 35,961 || 28–23 || 
|- align="center" bgcolor="bbffbb" 
| 52 || May 28 || Pirates || 5–4 || Prior (6–2) || D'Amico (4–5) || Borowski (10) || 32,406 || 29–23 || 
|- align="center" bgcolor="ffbbbb"
| 53 || May 30 || Astros || 9–1 || Miller (3–6) || Estes (5–4) || || 36,687 || 29–24 || 
|- align="center" bgcolor="bbffbb" 
| 54 || May 31 || Astros || 1 – 0 (16) || Wellemeyer (1–0) || Stone (4–1) || || 37,719 || 30–24 || 
|-

|- align="center" bgcolor="ffbbbb" 
| 55 || June 1 || Astros || 9–3 || Robertson (4–3) || Wood (4–4) || || 37,787 || 30–25 || 
|- align="center" bgcolor="bbffbb" 
| 56 || June 3 || Devil Rays || 3–2 || Remlinger (4–0) || Levine (2–2) || || 32,210 || 31–25 || 
|- align="center" bgcolor="ffbbbb" 
| 57 || June 4 || Devil Rays || 5–2 || Zambrano (2–3) || Estes (5–5) || || 33,317 || 31–26 || 
|- align="center" bgcolor="bbffbb" 
| 58 || June 5 || Devil Rays || 8–1 || Clement (3–6) || Brazelton (1–5) || || 28,713 || 32–26 || 
|- align="center" bgcolor="ffbbbb" 
| 59 || June 6 || Yankees || 5–3 || Wells (8–2) || Zambrano (5–5) || Rivera (5) || 39,359 || 32–27 || 
|- align="center" bgcolor="bbffbb" 
| 60 || June 7 || Yankees || 5–2 || Wood (5–4) || Clemens (6–4) || || 39,363 || 33–27 || 
|- align="center" bgcolor="bbffbb" 
| 61 || June 8 || Yankees || 8–7 || Prior (7–2) || Pettitte (5–6) || Borowski (11) || 39,341 || 34–27 || 
|- align="center" bgcolor="bbffbb" 
| 62 || June 10 || @ Orioles || 4–0 || Estes (6–5) || Hentgen (1–4) || || 32,484 || 35–27 || 
|- align="center" bgcolor="bbffbb" 
| 63 || June 11 || @ Orioles || 7–6 || Clement (4–6) || Daal (4–7) || Borowski (12) || 28,013 || 36–27 || 
|- align="center" bgcolor="ffbbbb" 
| 64 || June 12 || @ Orioles || 6–1 || Helling (4–4) || Zambrano (5–6) || Driskill (1) || 30,557 || 36–28 || 
|- align="center" bgcolor="ffbbbb" 
| 65 || June 13 || @ Blue Jays || 5–1 || Escobar (4–3) || Wood (5–5) || || 23,018 || 36–29 || 
|- align="center" bgcolor="bbffbb" 
| 66 || June 14 || @ Blue Jays || 4–2 || Prior (8–2) || Davis (3–4) || Borowski (13) || 33,167 || 37–29 || 
|- align="center" bgcolor="ffbbbb" 
| 67 || June 15 || @ Blue Jays || 5 – 4 (10) || López (1–1) || Guthrie (0–3) || || 34,221 || 37–30 || 
|- align="center" bgcolor="bbffbb" 
| 68 || June 16 || @ Reds || 4–3 || Clement (5–6) || Anderson (1–3) || Borowski (14) || 28,669 || 38–30 || 
|- align="center" bgcolor="ffbbbb" 
| 69 || June 17 || @ Reds || 2 – 1 (10) || Williamson (4–2) || Remlinger (4–1) || || 28,999 || 38–31 || 
|- align="center" bgcolor="bbffbb" 
| 70 || June 18 || @ Reds || 4–1 || Wood (6–5) || Haynes (1–6) || || 39,053 || 39–31 || 
|- align="center" bgcolor="ffbbbb" 
| 71 || June 19 || @ Reds || 3–1 || Wilson (5–4) || Prior (8–3) || Williamson (17) || 41,692 || 39–32 || 
|- align="center" bgcolor="ffbbbb" 
| 72 || June 20 || White Sox || 12–3 || Garland (5–6) || Estes (6–6) || || 39,080 || 39–33 || 
|- align="center" bgcolor="ffbbbb" 
| 73 || June 21 || White Sox || 7–6 || Buehrle (4–10) || Clement (5–7) || Koch (10) || 38,938 || 39–34 || 
|- align="center" bgcolor="bbffbb" 
| 74 || June 22 || White Sox || 2–1 || Zambrano (6–6) || Marte (2–1) || Borowski (15) || 38,223 || 40–34 || 
|- align="center" bgcolor="bbffbb" 
| 75 || June 24 || Brewers || 9–1 || Wood (7–5) || Quevedo (1–4) || || 40,389 || 41–34 || 
|- align="center" bgcolor="ffbbbb" 
| 76 || June 25 || Brewers || 12 – 6 (10) || Vizcaíno (2–3) || Wellemeyer (1–1) || || 38,357 || 41–35 || 
|- align="center" bgcolor="ffbbbb" 
| 77 || June 26 || Brewers || 5–3 || Estrella (2–0) || Borowski (1–1) || DeJean (16) || 39,711 || 41–36 || 
|- align="center" bgcolor="ffbbbb" 
| 78 || June 27 || @ White Sox || 4–3 || Koch (3–4) || Alfonseca (0–1) || || 45,147 || 41–37 || 
|- align="center" bgcolor="ffbbbb" 
| 79 || June 28 || @ White Sox || 7–6 || Koch (4–4) || Cruz (1–3) || || 45,440 || 41–38 || 
|- align="center" bgcolor="bbffbb" 
| 80 || June 29 || @ White Sox || 5–2 || Wood (8–5) || Loaiza (11–3) || || 44,858 || 42–38 || 
|- align="center" bgcolor="ffbbbb" 
| 81 || June 30 || @ Phillies || 4–3 || Padilla (7–7) || Estes (6–7) || Mesa (18) || 23,323 || 42–39 || 
|-

|- align="center" bgcolor="ffbbbb" 
| 82 || July 1 || @ Phillies || 4–3 || Adams (1–2) || Remlinger (4–2) || || 25,307 || 42–40 || 
|- align="center" bgcolor="bbffbb" 
| 83 || July 2 || @ Phillies || 1–0 || Farnsworth (3–0) || Wendell (1–2) || Borowski (16) || 23,591 || 43–40 || 
|- align="center" bgcolor="ffbbbb" 
| 84 || July 3 || @ Phillies || 12–2 || Myers (8–6) || Zambrano (6–7) || || 57,326 || 43–41 || 
|- align="center" bgcolor="ffbbbb" 
| 85 || July 4 || Cardinals || 11–8 || Tomko (5–5) || Wood (8–6) || || 39,756 || 43–42 || 
|- align="center" bgcolor="bbffbb"
| 86 || July 5 || Cardinals || 6–5 || Remlinger (5–2) || Fassero (1–4) || || 38,953 || 44–42 || 
|- align="center" bgcolor="ffbbbb" 
| 87 || July 6 || Cardinals || 4–1 || Williams (11–3) || Prior (8–4) || Isringhausen (3) || 37,713 || 44–43 || 
|- align="center" bgcolor="bbffbb"
| 88 || July 7 || Marlins || 6–3 || Clement (6–7) || Beckett (3–4) || Borowski (17) || 38,662 || 45–43 || 
|- align="center" bgcolor="ffbbbb" 
| 89 || July 8 || Marlins || 4–3 || Bump (2–0) || Remlinger (5–3) || Looper (16) || 33,227 || 45–44 || 
|- align="center" bgcolor="bbffbb"
| 90 || July 9 || Marlins || 5–1 || Wood (9–6) || Pavano (6–10) || || 33,054 || 46–44 || 
|- align="center" bgcolor="ffbbbb" 
| 91 || July 10 || Braves || 13–3 || Maddux (7–8) || Estes (6–8) || || 38,756 || 46–45 || 
|- align="center" bgcolor="ffbbbb" 
| 92 || July 11 || Braves || 9–5 || Hampton (5–5) || Prior (8–5) || || 39,334 || 46–46 || 
|- align="center" bgcolor="bbffbb" 
| 93 || July 12 || Braves || 7–3 || Clement (7–7) || Ramírez (8–3) || || 39,980 || 47–46 || 
|- align="center" bgcolor="ffbbbb"
| 94 || July 13 || Braves || 7–2 || Reynolds (7–4) || Zambrano (6–8) || || 39,832 || 47–47 || 
|- align="center" bgcolor="ffbbbb"
| 95 || July 18 || @ Marlins || 6–0 || Redman (8–4) || Clement (7–8) || || 26,174 || 47–48 || 
|- align="center" bgcolor="bbffbb" 
| 96 || July 19 || @ Marlins || 1–0 || Wood (10–6) || Penny (8–7) || || 30,432 || 48–48 || 
|- align="center" bgcolor="bbffbb" 
| 97 || July 20 || @ Marlins || 16–2 || Zambrano (7–8) || Willis (9–2) || || 25,574 || 49–48 || 
|- align="center" bgcolor="bbffbb" 
| 98 || July 21 || @ Braves || 15–6 || Veres (1–1) || Reynolds (7–5) || || 39,950 || 50–48 || 
|- align="center" bgcolor="ffbbbb"
| 99 || July 22 || @ Braves || 8–4 || Maddux (9–8) || Mitre (0–1) || || 39,226 || 50–49 || 
|- align="center" bgcolor="ffbbbb"
| 100 || July 23 || Phillies || 3–0 || Wolf (11–5) || Clement (7–9) || || 40,377 || 50–50 || 
|- align="center" bgcolor="ffbbbb"
| 101 || July 24 || Phillies || 14–6 || Padilla (9–8) || Wood (10–7) || || 40,266 || 50–51 || 
|- align="center" bgcolor="bbffbb" 
| 102 || July 25 || @ Astros || 5–3 || Zambrano (8–8) || Dotel (6–4) || Borowski (18) || 43,013 || 51–51 || 
|- align="center" bgcolor="ffbbbb"
| 103 || July 26 || @ Astros || 3–1 || Redding (7–9) || Cruz (1–4) || Wagner (31) || 42,679 || 51–52 || 
|- align="center" bgcolor="bbffbb" 
| 104 || July 27 || @ Astros || 5–3 || Estes (7–8) || Robertson (10–4) || Borowski (19) || 42,422 || 52–52 || 
|- align="center" bgcolor="bbffbb" 
| 105 || July 29 || Giants || 3–0 || Clement (8–9) || Moss (9–7) || || 40,221 || 53–52 || 
|- align="center" bgcolor="ffbbbb"
| 106 || July 30 || Giants || 6–3 || Schmidt (11–4) || Wood (10–8) || || 39,973 || 53–53 || 
|- align="center" bgcolor="bbffbb" 
| 107 || July 31 || Giants || 9–4 || Zambrano (9–8) || Brower (7–3) || || 39,422 || 54–53 || 
|-

|- align="center" bgcolor="bbffbb" 
| 108 || August 1 || D-backs || 4 – 3 (14) || Alfonseca (1–1) || Oropesa (2–2) || || 38,738 || 55–53 || 
|- align="center" bgcolor="ffbbbb"
| 109 || August 2 || D-backs || 4–3 || Villarreal (7–4) || Borowski (1–2) || Mantei (12) || 40,304 || 55–54 || 
|- align="center" bgcolor="bbffbb" 
| 110 || August 3 || D-backs || 2–1 || Clement (9–9) || Villarreal (7–5) || Veres (1) || 39,473 || 56–54 || 
|- align="center" bgcolor="bbffbb" 
| 111 || August 5 || @ Padres || 3–0 || Prior (9–5) || Lawrence (5–14) || Borowski (20) || 30,932 || 57–54 || 
|- align="center" bgcolor="bbffbb" 
| 112 || August 6 || @ Padres || 3–2 || Wood (11–8) || Eaton (6–8) || Borowski (21) || 29,265 || 58–54 || 
|- align="center" bgcolor="bbffbb" 
| 113 || August 7 || @ Padres || 9–3 || Zambrano (10–8) || Jarvis (4–4) || || 27,673 || 59–54 || 
|- align="center" bgcolor="ffbbbb"
| 114 || August 8 || @ Dodgers || 3–1 || Ashby (3–9) || Estes (7–9) || Gagné (31) || 52,911 || 59–55 || 
|- align="center" bgcolor="ffbbbb"
| 115 || August 9 || @ Dodgers || 6–1 || Álvarez (2–1) || Clement (9–10) || || 54,181 || 59–56 || 
|- align="center" bgcolor="bbffbb" 
| 116 || August 10 || @ Dodgers || 3–1 || Prior (10–5) || Brown (11–6) || || 51,729 || 60–56 || 
|- align="center" bgcolor="ffbbbb"
| 117 || August 11 || Astros || 3–1 || Miller (9–10) || Wood (11–9) || Wagner (34) || 39,889 || 60–57 || 
|- align="center" bgcolor="bbffbb" 
| 118 || August 12 || Astros || 3–0 || Zambrano (11–8) || Redding (8–10) || || 39,751 || 61–57 || 
|- align="center" bgcolor="bbffbb" 
| 119 || August 13 || Astros || 6–4 || Guthrie (1–3) || Robertson (11–6) || Borowski (22) || 39,631 || 62–57 || 
|- align="center" bgcolor="bbffbb" 
| 120 || August 14 || Astros || 7–1 || Clement (10–10) || Fernandez (1–2) || || 39,769 || 63–57 || 
|- align="center" bgcolor="bbffbb"  
| 121 || August 15 || Dodgers || 2–1 || Prior (11–5) || Kida (0–1) || || 40,188 || 64–57 || 
|- align="center" bgcolor="ffbbbb"
| 122 || August 16 || Dodgers || 10–5 || Pérez (9–9) || Remlinger (5–4) || || 40,032 || 64–58 || 
|- align="center" bgcolor="ffbbbb"
| 123 || August 17 || Dodgers || 3–0 || Nomo (14–9) || Zambrano (11–9) || Gagné (41) || 40,124 || 64–59 || 
|- align="center" bgcolor="ffbbbb"
| 124 || August 19 || @ Astros || 12–8 || Miceli (2–3) || Clement (10–11) || || 32,707 || 64–60 || 
|- align="center" bgcolor="bbffbb" 
| 125 || August 20 || @ Astros || 6–0 || Prior (12–5) || Fernandez (1–3) || || 32,810 || 65–60 || 
|- align="center" bgcolor="ffbbbb"
| 126 || August 21 || @ Astros || 9–3 || Villone (5–2) || Wood (11–10) || || 29,555 || 65–60 || 
|- align="center" bgcolor="bbffbb" 
| 127 || August 22 || @ D-backs || 4–1 || Zambrano (12–9) || Schilling (7–7) || || 39,612 || 66–61 || 
|- align="center" bgcolor="ffbbbb" 
| 128 || August 23 || @ D-backs || 13–2 || Batista (8–7) || Estes (7–10) || || 40,820 || 66–62 || 
|- align="center" bgcolor="bbffbb" 
| 129 || August 24 || @ D-backs || 5–3 || Clement (11–11) || Randolph (7–1) || Borowski (23) || 40,129 || 67–62 || 
|- align="center" bgcolor="bbffbb" 
| 130 || August 26 || @ Cardinals || 7–4 || Prior (13–5) || Stephenson (7–13) || || 36,563 || 68–62 || 
|- align="center" bgcolor="ffbbbb" 
| 131 || August 27 || @ Cardinals || 4–2 || Kline (5–5) || Farnsworth (3–1) || Isringhausen (15) || 32,667 || 68–63 || 
|- align="center" bgcolor="ffbbbb" 
| 132 || August 28 || @ Cardinals || 3–2 || DeJean (5–7) || Remlinger (5–5) || || 37,370 || 68–64 || 
|- align="center" bgcolor="bbffbb"  
| 133 || August 29 || Brewers || 4–2 || Clement (12–11) || Sheets (10–11) || || 38,215 || 69–64 || 
|- align="center" bgcolor="ffbbbb" 
| 134 || August 30 || Brewers || 9–5 || Kinney (10–9) || Estes (7–11) || || 39,805 || 69–65 || 
|- align="center" bgcolor="ffbbbb" 
| 135 || August 31 || Brewers || 2–0 || Davis (6–6) || Cruz (1–5) || Kolb (14) || 38,946 || 69–66 || 
|-

|- align="center" bgcolor="bbffbb" 
| 136 || September 1 || Cardinals || 7–0 || Prior (14–5) || Williams (14–7) || || 38,410 || 70–66 || 
|- align="center" bgcolor="bbffbb" 
| 137 || September 2 || Cardinals || 4 – 2 (15) || Guthrie (2–3) || Fassero (1–7) || || 31,990 || 71–66 || 
|- align="center" bgcolor="ffbbbb" 
| 138 || September 2 || Cardinals || 2–0 || Morris (9–6) || Wood (11–11) || Isringhausen (17) || 39,290 || 71–67 || 
|- align="center" bgcolor="bbffbb" 
| 139 || September 3 || Cardinals || 8–7 || Borowski (2–2) || Williams (14–8) || || 32,710 || 72–67 || 
|- align="center" bgcolor="bbffbb" 
| 140 || September 4 || Cardinals || 7–6 || Remlinger (6–5) || DeJean (5–8) || Borowski (24) || 35,129 || 73–67 || 
|- align="center" bgcolor="bbffbb" 
| 141 || September 5 || @ Brewers || 4–2 || Cruz (2–5) || Sheets (10–12) || Borowski (25) || 42,909 || 74–67 || 
|- align="center" bgcolor="bbffbb" 
| 142 || September 6 || @ Brewers || 8–4 || Prior (15–5) || Kinney (10–10) || || 46,218 || 75–67 || 
|- align="center" bgcolor="bbffbb" 
| 143 || September 7 || @ Brewers || 9–2 || Wood (12–11) || Davis (6–7) || || 42,127 || 76–67 || 
|- align="center" bgcolor="bbffbb" 
| 144 || September 9 || @ Expos || 4–3 || Zambrano (13–9) || Day (7–7) || Borowski (26) || 15,632 || 77–67 || 
|- align="center" bgcolor="ffbbbb" 
| 145 || September 10 || @ Expos || 8–4 || Ayala (9–3) || Farnsworth (3–2) || || 18,002 || 77–68 || 
|- align="center" bgcolor="ffbbbb" 
| 146 || September 11 || @ Expos || 3–2 || Ohka (9–12) || Prior (15–6) || Eischen (1) || 12,559 || 77–69 || 
|- align="center" bgcolor="bbffbb" 
| 147 || September 12 || Reds || 7–6 || Alfonseca (2–1) || Randall (2–2) || Borowski (27) || 38,219 || 78–69 || 
|- align="center" bgcolor="bbffbb" 
| 148 || September 13 || Reds || 9–6 || Alfonseca (3–1) || Belisle (1–1) || Borowski (28) || 39,983 || 79–69 || 
|- align="center" bgcolor="ffbbbb" 
| 149 || September 14 || Reds || 1–0 || Riedling (2–3) || Zambrano (13–10) || Reitsma (9) || 38,827 || 79–70 || 
|- align="center" bgcolor="bbffbb" 
| 150 || September 15 || Mets || 4–1 || Clement (13–11) || Griffiths (1–3) || Borowski (29) || 38,698 || 80–70 || 
|- align="center" bgcolor="bbffbb" 
| 151 || September 16 || Mets || 3–2 || Prior (16–6) || Seo (8–12) || Borowski (30) || 39,534 || 81–70 || 
|- align="center" bgcolor="bbffbb" 
| 152 || September 17 || Mets || 2–0 || Wood (13–11) || Leiter (14–9) || || 38,482 || 82–70 || 
|- align="center" bgcolor="bbffbb" 
| 153 || September 19 || @ Pirates || 10–9 || Veres (2–1) || Figueroa (2–1) || Borowski (31) || || 83–70 || 
|- align="center" bgcolor="ffbbbb" 
| 154 || September 19 || @ Pirates || 10–6 || Torres (6–5) || Cruz (2–6) || || 16,248 || 83–71 || 
|- align="center" bgcolor="ffbbbb" 
| 155 || September 20 || @ Pirates || 8–2 || Vogelsong (2–1) || Clement (13–12) || || 32,869 || 83–72 || 
|- align="center" bgcolor="bbffbb" 
| 156 || September 21 || @ Pirates || 4–1 || Prior (17–6) || Pérez (4–10) || Borowski (32) || 21,497 || 84–72 || 
|- align="center" bgcolor="bbffbb" 
| 157 || September 23 || @ Reds || 6–0 || Wood (14–11) || Randall (2–4) || || 26,124 || 85–72 || 
|- align="center" bgcolor="bbffbb" 
| 158 || September 24 || @ Reds || 8–0 || Estes (8–11) || Hall (0–2) || || 27,021 || 86–72 || 
|- align="center" bgcolor="ffbbbb" 
| 159 || September 25 || @ Reds || 9–7 || Van Poppel (3–1) || Zambrano (13–11) || Reitsma (12) || 36,963 || 86–73 || 
|- align="center" bgcolor="bbbbbb" 
| – || September 26 || Pirates || colspan=7|Postponed (rain) Rescheduled for September 27
|- align="center" bgcolor="bbffbb" 
| 160 || September 27 || Pirates || 4–2 || Prior (18–6) || Fogg (10–9) || Borowski (33) || || 87–73 || 
|- align="center" bgcolor="bbffbb" 
| 161 || September 27 || Pirates || 7–2 || Clement (14–12) || Vogelsong (2–2) || || 40,121 || 88–73 || 
|- align="center" bgcolor="ffbbbb" 
| 162 || September 28 || Pirates || 3–2 || Wells (10–9) || Cruz (2–7) || Tavárez (11) || 39,940 || 88–74 || 
|-

Batting
Source

Note: G = Games played; AB = At bats; R = Runs; H = Hits; 2B = Doubles; 3B = Triples; HR = Home runs; RBI = Runs batted in; Avg. = Batting average; OBP = On base percentage; SLG = Slugging percentage; SB = Stolen bases

Pitching
Source

Note: W = Wins; L = Losses; ERA = Earned run average; G = Games pitched; GS = Games started; SV = Saves; IP = Innings pitched; H = Hits allowed; R = Runs allowed; ER = Earned runs allowed; BB = Walks allowed; K = Strikeouts

Postseason

2003 NLDS

Atlanta Braves vs. Chicago Cubs

Game 1 – Chicago 4, Atlanta 2

Game 2 – Atlanta 5, Chicago 3

Game 3 – Chicago 3, Atlanta 1

Game 4 – Atlanta 6, Chicago 4

Game 5 – Chicago 5, Atlanta 1

For the first time since October 14. 1908, the Cubs had won a postseason series, doing so at Turner Field in Atlanta.

2003 NLCS

Game 1
October 7: Wrigley Field, Chicago

Game 2
October 8: Wrigley Field, Chicago

Game 3
October 10: Pro Player Stadium, Miami, Florida

Game 4
October 11: Pro Player Stadium, Miami

Game 5
October 12: Pro Player Stadium, Miami

With the Marlins facing elimination, Josh Beckett kept them alive by dominating the Cubs, holding them to just two hits and one walk as part of his standout 2003 postseason. The game was scoreless until the sixth inning when Mike Lowell hit a two-run homer. Iván Rodríguez and Jeff Conine homered in the seventh and eighth innings respectively. Even with the loss, the Cubs looked good going back home with their two aces, Mark Prior and Kerry Wood ready to start Games 6 and 7.

Game 6
October 14: Wrigley Field, Chicago, Illinois

The Cubs held a 3-0 lead going into the top of the eighth inning in Game 6 and, after Mike Mordecai hit a high pop fly to left field for the first out of the inning, had only two outs left in the inning—leaving the team a mere 5 outs away from their first World Series berth since 1945.

Prior had retired the last eight hitters and had allowed only three hits up to that point. Center fielder Juan Pierre (who was later traded to the Cubs) then hit a double off Prior.

On the eighth pitch of his at bat, Luis Castillo hit a high foul ball toward the left field wall. Cubs left fielder Moisés Alou headed toward the stands to catch the ball for the potential second out. As Alou reached for the ball, Cubs fan Steve Bartman, along with others near the area, did the same. The ball bounced off Bartman's hand and into the stands. Though the Cubs pleaded for a call of fan interference, the umpire ruled that the ball had left the field of play and was therefore up for grabs. Alou initially said that he would not have made the catch, though he later denied making the statement, saying that if he had, it was only to make Bartman feel better.

As a result, Castillo remained an active batter at home plate. On the next pitch, Prior walked Castillo on a wild pitch that got away from catcher Paul Bako, also allowing Pierre to advance to third base.

Next, Iván Rodríguez hit an 0-2 pitch hard into left field, singling and scoring Pierre. Miguel Cabrera then hit a ground ball toward Cubs shortstop Alex Gonzalez that could have ended the inning on a double play. Gonzalez, who led all NL shortstops in fielding percentage, closed his glove a little too early and the ball landed in the dirt, allowing Cabrera to get on base, loading the bases. On the next pitch, Derrek Lee (a future Cubs' All-Star) drilled a double into left field, scoring Castillo and Rodríguez to tie the game at 3-3.

Prior was then taken out of the game and replaced by Kyle Farnsworth, who intentionally walked Mike Lowell to load the bases. Jeff Conine then hit a sacrifice fly to right field for the second out of the inning, allowing Cabrera to score from third and the other runners to each advance one base. This gave the Marlins their first lead of the night. Farnsworth intentionally walked Todd Hollandsworth (another future Cub) to once again load the bases.

The Marlins now having batted around the order, Farnsworth faced Mike Mordecai, who was looking to make up for his earlier out. This time, Mordecai prevailed, hitting a bases-clearing double to left-center field, allowing Lee, Lowell and Hollandsworth to score and making it a 7-3 Marlins lead.

Farnsworth was then taken out of the game and replaced by Mike Remlinger, who gave up a single to Pierre to score Mordecai from second base. Finally, Luis Castillo hit a high pop fly ball to shallow right field for the third out.

The Marlins' lead held, forcing a final Game 7.

Game 7
October 15: Wrigley Field, Chicago, Illinois

The Marlins got off to a quick 3–0 lead in the first inning against Cubs pitching ace Kerry Wood, who hadn't lost at Wrigley Field in nearly six weeks. The Cubs responded by tying the ball game 3–3 in the second inning, which featured a two-run home run by Wood. Moisés Alou's two-run home run the following inning put Chicago up 5–3, but the lead wouldn't last. In the fifth inning, Florida capitalized on a pair of walks and scored three runs to go on top 6–5, a lead they would not relinquish. The Marlins added a run in the sixth and two more in the seventh to expand their lead to 9–5. Cubs pinch-hitter Troy O'Leary hit a home run the bottom of the seventh, making the score 9–6. After the Cubs were retired in order in the eighth inning, Florida closer Ugueth Urbina hit Aramis Ramírez with a pitch to lead off the ninth inning and proceeded to retire the following three batters, giving the Marlins their second National League pennant in their eleven-year existence.

Farm system 

LEAGUE CHAMPIONS: Lansing

References

2003 Chicago Cubs team at Baseball-Reference
Game Logs:
1st Half: Chicago Cubs Game Log on ESPN.com
2nd Half: Chicago Cubs Game Log on ESPN.com
Batting Statistics:
 All Position Hitting Stats on Cubs.com

Chicago Cubs seasons
Chicago Cubs season
National League Central champion seasons
Cub